Scotorythra trachyopis is a moth of the family Geometridae. It was first described by Edward Meyrick in 1899. It is endemic to the Hawaiian island of Kauai.

External links

T
Endemic moths of Hawaii
Biota of Kauai